The following is a list of songs written by Natalie Sims, a musician, songwriter, graphic designer and visual artist, writer, and music executive from Tulsa, Oklahoma. This list is of songs written in addition to her own work and works on which she has featured, both of which can be found at Natalie Lauren discography. As a songwriter, Sims' credits include extensive collaborations with her friend KB, the Iggy Azalea singles "Work", "Change Your Life" featuring T.I., and "Bounce", and the single "I'll Find You" by Lecrae featuring Tori Kelly. "Work" and "I'll Find You" each sold over one million copies in the US and were certified platinum, while "Change Your Life" sold over 500,000 copies and was certified gold. Other credits include compositions for Chris Brown Keke Palmer, Trip Lee, Jimi Cravity, Tedashii, Casey J, Gawvi, Joseph Solomon, and Koryn Hawthorne.

List of songs

References 

Lists of songs by songwriters